Boundary Creek Wildlife Management Area at  is an Idaho wildlife management area in Boundary County along the border with British Columbia, Canada. It was purchased in 1999 with Fish and Game license funds Bonneville Power Administration wildlife mitigation funds. The WMA is open from sunrise to sunset, and access is free. 

It is located along the Kootenai River, which contains the white sturgeon, an endangered species. Wildlife found in the WMA included ruffed grouse, wild turkey, rough-legged hawk, great horned owl, and a variety of waterfowl and other wildlife.

References

Protected areas established in 1999
Protected areas of Boundary County, Idaho
Wildlife management areas of Idaho
1999 establishments in Idaho